Migraine Action (MA) was the UK's leading charity offering support and advisory information to those affected by migraine, whether individuals, families, employers or employees and medical professionals. It closed in 2018.

History
It was founded in 1958 and previously known as the British Migraine Association. It was a member of the Headache UK alliance. Its office is based in Leicester but MA is a national organization helping the one in seven people estimated to be affected by migraine across the UK, including 10% of school-aged children.
The charity ran a telephone helpline and has over 100 of Department of Health accredited leaflets on all aspects of migraine. It also ran a specialist headache nurse service, had websites for adults and children with migraine, ran information and support events around the UK and helped to fund research into migraine and to support the work of specialist migraine centres.

Migraine Action closed in 2018 and donated its assets to the Migraine Trust.

See also
 Migraine

References

External links
 
 Patient UK
 Headache UK

Health charities in the United Kingdom
Neurology organizations
Organizations established in 1958
Migraine
Charities based in Leicestershire
1958 establishments in England